Luxembourg–Turkey relations are the foreign relations between Luxembourg and Turkey. Following Luxembourg's independence from the Netherlands, Turkey recognized Luxembourg on May 31, 1867. The Turkish Embassy in Luxembourg was established in 1987. In response, Luxembourg opened its embassy in Ankara on November 29, 2011.

Diplomatic relations 

Relations became tense in late 1990s following the 1997 Luxembourg Council meeting, where the German Chancellor Helmut Kohl defined the European Union as requiring “civilization,” which a Muslim majority country such as Turkey lacked.

Turks were further shocked by the discussion in which the Greek foreign minister Pangalos gave an unmitigated description of the Turks as “bandits, murderers and rapists.’’

Official visits

Economic relations 

 Trade volume between the two countries was US$160 million in 2017 (Turkish exports/imports: 36/124 million USD).
 There are direct flights from Istanbul to Luxembourg City twice daily.
 2,764 tourists from Luxembourg visited Turkey in 2015.

See also 

 Foreign relations of Luxembourg
 Foreign relations of Turkey

References

Further reading 

 Barber, Lionel. “EU Group Rebuffs Turkish Entry Push,” Financial Times, 5 March 1997.
 Boomgaarden, Hajo G. “Religion and Party Positions Towards Turkish EU Accession,” Comparative European Politics, 10 (2012). 
 De Vreese, Claes. “A Threat Called Turkey: Perceived Religious Threat and Support for EU Entry of Croatia, Switzerland and Turkey,” Acta Politica, 48.1 (2013).
 Heinz, Kramer, A Changing Turkey: A Challenge to Europe and the US (Washington, DC: Brookings Institution Press, 2000), p. 287, footnote 40. 
 Hurd, Elizabeth Shakman. “Negotiating Europe: The Politics of Religion and the Prospects for Turkish Accession,” Review of International Studies, 32.3 (2006), p. 406. 
 McLaren, Lauren M. “Explaining Opposition to Turkish Membership of the EU,” European Union Politics, 8.2 (2007). 
 Müftüler, Leyla. “Through the Looking Glass: Turkey in Europe,” Turkish Studies, 1.1 (Spring 2000). 
 Neumann, Iver B. Uses of the Other: The East in European Identity Formation (Minneapolis: University of Minnesota Press, 1999).

 
Turkey
Bilateral relations of Turkey